Rowley Hill may refer to:

People
 Rowley Hill (bishop) (1836–1887), Anglican Bishop of Sodor and Man.

Places
 Rowley Hills, group of hills located in the West Midlands, England. 
 Rowley's Hill, located near the villages of Harston and Newton in Cambridgeshire, England.